Liam Forsyth (born 23 March 1996) is a former professional rugby league footballer who last played as a er or  for the Swinton Lions in the Betfred Championship. He retired from playing in July 2022 due to injury. 

He has played for the Wigan Warriors in the Super League, and on loan from Wigan at Swinton in the Championship. Forsyth has also played for the Leigh Centurions in the Championship.

Playing career
He made his professional début practising for Bath rugby union with George Ford in 2016.

Wigan Warriors
In 2017 he made his Wigan Warriors Super League début against the Warrington Wolves.

Swinton Lions
On 1 September 2020 it was announced that Forsyth would move to the Swinton Lions on a permanent basis.

References

External links
Swinton Lions profile
Wigan Warriors profile
SL profile

1996 births
Living people
English rugby league players
Leigh Leopards players
Rugby league wingers
Swinton Lions players
Wigan Warriors players